Plakina nathaliae is a species of sea sponge in the order Homosclerophorida, first found in vertical walls of reef caves at depths of about  in the Caribbean Sea. It has a leaf-like flat body, which is loosely attached to the substrate and a perforated, unlobate surface; it contains two bacterial s and is characterized by two mesohylar cell types with inclusions.

In March 2017, the species was reassigned to Plakina Schulze, 1880.

References

Further reading
Domingos, Celso, Anaíra Lage, and Guilherme Muricy. "Overview of the biodiversity and distribution of the Class Homoscleromorpha in the Tropical Western Atlantic." Journal of the Marine Biological Association of the United Kingdom: 1-11.
PINZON, César Augusto RUIZ. "Archives pour la catégorie Bourses."

External links
Porifera Database

Homoscleromorpha
Fauna of the Caribbean
Animals described in 2014